Donald Johnson and Jared Palmer were the defending champions but did not compete that year.

Mahesh Bhupathi and Leander Paes won in the final 6–2, 6–4 against Julian Knowle and Michael Kohlmann.

Seeds
Champion seeds are indicated in bold text while text in italics indicates the round in which those seeds were eliminated.

  Mahesh Bhupathi /  Leander Paes (champions)
  Sjeng Schalken /  Kevin Ullyett (quarterfinals)
  Lucas Arnold /  Gastón Etlis (quarterfinals)
  David Adams /  Simon Aspelin (quarterfinals)

Draw

External links
 2002 Majorca Open Doubles draw

Doubles